Frédéric Coquerel (born 25 November 1978) is a retired French footballer who played as a forward. He played professionally for Caen in Ligue 2 between 2001 and 2003.

External links

1978 births
Living people
People from Bernay, Eure
French footballers
Association football forwards
Stade Malherbe Caen players
AS Beauvais Oise players
Tours FC players
Vannes OC players
US Orléans players
Ligue 2 players
Sportspeople from Eure
Footballers from Normandy